Cyril Louis Hoft (24 September 1896 – 5 July 1949) was an Australian rules footballer who played for the  and Perth Football Clubs in the West Australian Football League (WAFL) and the Glenelg Football Club in the South Australian Football League (SAFL).

Family and early life
The son of Herman Hoft (-1936), and Amelia Ann Hoft (-1954), née Haley, Cyril Louis Hoft was born on 24 September 1896. He grew up in the South-West region of Western Australia, moving to Perth to attend Scotch College, where he played in the school's football team.

He married Dorothy Marjorie Davies, in Perth, on 22 June 1925.

Football

North Fremantle (WAFL)
Because his school was located in  recruitment zone, Hoft began his career with that club, playing eleven games for North Fremantle in 1914.

Third Divisional team (AIF)

He played for the (winning) Third Australian Divisional team in the famous "Pioneer Exhibition Game" of Australian Rules football, held in London, in October 1916 that had been organised by Frank Beaurepaire. A news film was taken at the match.

Perth (WAFL)
Hoft resuming his league career with Perth in 1919.

Sandover medal
Hoft tied with 's Tom Outridge, on 14 votes, in the inaugural Sandover Medal count in 1921. Prior to 1930, only one vote was given in each game, meaning that both Hoft and Outridge had been best on the ground in 14 matches.

Because there was no provision, in that inaugural year, for a tied vote, and it was decided to leave the choice of the single winner to "an adjudicator" that was to be appointed by Messrs. Sandover and Co. (the donors of the medal). It was decided to allow the WAFL president, Alf Moffat, to cast the deciding vote, which he gave to Outridge.

In 1997, along with a number of other players who had tied for first, but lost on countback, Hoft was awarded a retrospective medal.

Glenelg (SAFL)
In 1924, Hoft switched to Glenelg in the SAFL. Standing out in a team that had yet to win a match, Hoft was appointed captain two rounds into the season, and won the club's best and fairest in 1924. He was appointed captain-coach in 1925, and guided the club to its first ever win after 56 losses, an upset against reigning premiers West Torrens.

Perth (WAFL)
Hoft returned to Perth in 1928, playing one game in his final season with the club before retiring.

Interstate football
Hoft represented Western Australia  at the Fourth Australian National Football Carnival, in Perth, in August 1921, South Australia at the Fifth Australian National Football Carnival, in Hobart, in August 1924, and, once again, South Australia at the Sixth Australian National Football Carnival, in Melbourne, in August 1927.

Military service
Hoft enlisted in the First AIF in February 1915. Serving overseas, as a private, in the 44 Infantry Battalion, he saw action in the European theatre, where he was wounded in action on two separate occasions.

Death
He died in July 1949 after a long illness, leaving his wife (Dorothy, née Davies) and six children (June, Kevin, Les, Lois, Maureen, and Peter).

See also
 1916 Pioneer Exhibition Game

Footnotes

References

 Pioneer Exhibition Game Australian Football: in aid of British and French Red Cross Societies: 3rd Australian Division v. Australian Training Units at Queen's Club, West Kensington, on Saturday, October 28th, 1916, at 3pm, Wightman & Co., (London), 1919.
 First World War Embarkation Roll: Private Cyril Louis Hoft (785), collection of the Australian War Memorial. 
 World War One Nominal Roll: Private Cyril Louis Hoft (785), Australian War Memorial.
 World War One Service Record: Private Cyril Louis Hoft (785), National Archives of Australia.
 Photograph at Glenelg, The (Adelaide) Chronicle, (Saturday, 9 July 1927), p.40, third from right, middle row.
 Richardson, N. (2016), The Game of Their Lives, Pan Macmillan Australia: Sydney.

External links
 

1896 births
1949 deaths
Australian military personnel of World War I
Australian Rules footballers: place kick exponents
Participants in "Pioneer Exhibition Game" (London, 28 October 1916)
Glenelg Football Club coaches
Glenelg Football Club players
North Fremantle Football Club players
Australian rules footballers from Perth, Western Australia
Perth Football Club players
Sandover Medal winners
Military personnel from Western Australia
People educated at Scotch College, Perth